Śrīvāsa Thakura was a close associate of Chaitanya Mahaprabhu and a member of the Pancha Tattva.

Srivasa Thakura is understood as tatastha-shakti, a marginal energy of Bhagavan, Krishna in person. Devotees who are headed by Srivasa Thakura are described as 'parts' of transcendental body of Sri Caitanya Mahaprabhu (his eyes, ears, hands, disc/cakra, etc.). They all participated in His transcendental pastimes. They all helped to spread Krsna consciousness, sankirtana-yajna. On the other hand, Srivasa is also Narada - an eternal transcendental associate of Lord Krsna. Srivasa was studying Srimad-Bhagavatam  with Advaita Acarya, who was at that time in Navadvipa. They worshiped Krsna, who as an answer to their prayers, appeared as Caitanya Mahaprabhu and converted many atheists - Buddhists and others who were opposed to pure devotional service - making them all His loving devotees.

The home of Srivasa, Srivasangam, was a place where Sri Caitanya perform sankirtana-yajna, congregational chanting of Krsna's Holy Names, and it was a place where Kazi, a noted Muslim leader, ruled. However, Kazi had a dream where Sri Caitanya said that he should allow devotional service, so since that time Kazi promised that he would never oppose sankirtana-yajna, and also that no one from his family would ever be against Krsna. Kazi was Kamsa in some previous life, but Sri Caitanya showed him mercy by making him devotee. This is inconceivable - Kamsa was enemy of Krsna, Kamsa was an Asura or demon who wanted to kill Krsna, but Caitanya came and mercifully gave even such a demon as Kazi devotional service to Krsna. There is a story that Kazi was serious about converting devotees of Caitanya Mahaprabhu into Muslims, but this happened just the opposite – so many Muslims later changed their chanting from names of Allah into chanting Holy names of Hari, Krsna. So impersonlists, Buddhists, Muslims - all became devotees by mercy of Sri Caitanya Mahaprabhu. Srivasa laughed at the religious fanaticism of Kazi.

In the house of Srivasa, Chaitanya showed His transcendental form to all His eternal associates. So Srivasa is also a place from which Krishna consciousness movement around five hundred years ago was started.

Srivasa Thakura had  previously lived in Sri Hatta, but  because he wanted the association of devotees he went to live on the banks of the Ganges in Nabadwip. Srivasa Thakura had three brothers: Sripati, Srirama and Srinidhi. He also had one son, but at a young age his son died.

Pancha Tattva mantra

Srivasa is mentioned in the Pancha Tattva (Vaishnavism) mantra as representative of a pure devotee.

Life and pastimes of Srivasa Pandita
Pastimes at his house in Mayapur
More pastimes - Pastimes with Chand Kazi

Footnotes

16th-century Hindu religious leaders
Gaudiya religious leaders
Bengali Hindus
Scholars from West Bengal